Qaleh-ye Bala Baram (also Romanized as Qal‘eh-ye Bālā Baram) is a village in Howmeh Rural District, in the Central District of Damghan County, Semnan Province, Iran. At the 2006 census, its population was 115, in 32 families.

References 

Populated places in Damghan County